"You Run Away" is a song by Canadian rock band Barenaked Ladies. It is the first single from their album All in Good Time. It was released January 8 for online streaming. The commercial download single was released February 2, 2010.

History
"You Run Away" was written by Ed Robertson, and was partially inspired by Steven Page's departure from the band in February 2009.

The music video for "You Run Away" was released on February 22, 2010, making it their first music video they have actually appeared in since 2003's "Testing 1,2,3". The song's video uses the radio edit of the song, which cuts half of the instrumental intro, and half of the second chorus which is a double-chorus on the album version. The two halves of the chorus are cross-mixed between "you could turn and stay" and "but you run away from me".

Charts

References

Barenaked Ladies songs
Songs written by Ed Robertson
2010 singles
2010 songs
Music videos directed by Phil Harder